Sam Bennett may refer to:

 Sam Bennett (baseball) (1884–1969), Negro league baseball player
 Sam Bennett (cyclist) (born 1990), Irish cyclist
 Sam Bennett (ice hockey) (born 1996), Canadian ice hockey player
 Sam Bennett (Pennsylvania politician), American politician from Pennsylvania
 Sam Bennett (Passions), a character on the American soap opera Passions
 Sam Bennett (Private Practice), a character on the TV series Private Practice
 Samuel Bennett (1815–1878), journalist and newspaper owner in colonial Australia